The Mixed 4 × 100 metre freestyle relay competition of the 2014 European Aquatics Championships was held on 22 August.

Results

Final
The final was held at 19:33.

References

Mixed 4 x 100 metre freestyle relay
European